The 1890 Columbia football team was an American football team that represented Columbia University as an independent during the 1890 college football season. The team had no coach. A.C. Gildersleeve was the team captain.

The team played its home games at Brotherhood Park in Manhattan.

Schedule

References

Columbia
Columbia Lions football seasons
Columbia football